This article contains a list of named passenger trains in Russia.

List

Gallery

References

Russia
 
Named passenger trains